Prabhasa is a genus of moths in the family Erebidae.

Most species were previously placed in the genus Eilema.

Species
 Prabhasa plumbeomicans Hampson, 1894
 Prabhasa monastyrskii Dubatolov, 2012
 Prabhasa venosa Moore, 1878

References

 

Lithosiina
Moth genera